The 2022 Abu Dhabi Grand Prix (officially known as the Formula 1 Etihad Airways Abu Dhabi Grand Prix 2022) was a Formula One motor race that was held on 20 November 2022 at the Yas Marina Circuit in Abu Dhabi, United Arab Emirates. Max Verstappen won the race ahead of Charles Leclerc and Sergio Pérez. Leclerc's finish ahead of Pérez decided the fight between the two for second in the Drivers' Championship in his favour. This was the 299th and final Grand Prix for four-time World Champion, Sebastian Vettel.

Background
The event was held across the weekend of the 18–20 November. It was the twenty-second and final race of the 2022 Formula One World Championship.

Championship standings before the race
Going into the weekend, both the Drivers' and Constructors' titles were already decided at the Japanese and United States Grands Prix, respectively. Max Verstappen led the Drivers' Championship with 429 points with Charles Leclerc, second, and Sergio Pérez, third, both with 290 points. Red Bull Racing led the Constructors' Championship from Ferrari by 195 points and Mercedes by 214 points.

Entrants

The drivers and teams were the same as the season entry list with no additional stand-in drivers for the race. Felipe Drugovich (Aston Martin), Pietro Fittipaldi (Haas), Patricio O'Ward (McLaren), Logan Sargeant (Williams), Jack Doohan (Alpine), Robert Kubica (Alfa Romeo), Robert Shwartzman (Ferrari) and Liam Lawson (Red Bull Racing) drove in the first practice session in place of Lance Stroll, Mick Schumacher, Lando Norris, Nicholas Latifi, Fernando Alonso, Zhou Guanyu, Carlos Sainz Jr. and Verstappen, respectively. In doing so, Drugovich and O'Ward made their Formula One practice debut.

The Grand Prix was also the last for Fernando Alonso at Alpine and for Pierre Gasly at AlphaTauri before moving to Aston Martin and Alpine, respectively.

Tyre choices

Tyre supplier Pirelli brought the C3, C4, and C5 tyre compounds (designated hard, medium, and soft, respectively) for teams to use at the event.

Track changes 
The first DRS detection point was moved further back, being positioned  before turn 5.

Penalties 
McLaren's Daniel Ricciardo carried a three-place grid penalty for causing a collision with Kevin Magnussen at the previous round, the São Paulo Grand Prix.

Qualifying

Qualifying report
Kevin Magnussen, having taken his maiden pole position the previous race at the São Paulo Grand Prix, was eliminated in the first segment and he was out-qualified by outgoing Haas teammate Mick Schumacher for the sixth time out of 22. Sebastian Vettel believed he was impeded by Red Bull Racing drivers on three occasions; by Sergio Pérez in the first segment and twice by Max Verstappen during the second segnent. Although Vettel argued that the infringements cost him "a tenth" of a second per lap, it did not prevent him from progressing from both those stages. He qualified ninth, equaling his season's best result.

Verstappen aided Pérez's attempt in the final segment by giving him a slipstream throughout the lap, as Red Bull Racing sought to provide Pérez with every opportunity to finish ahead of Charles Leclerc for second in the championship. It was Verstappen who took pole position, his seventh of the season, with Pérez qualifying second to give Red Bull Racing their first front-row lockout since the 2018 Mexican Grand Prix.

Qualifying classification 

Notes
  – Daniel Ricciardo received a three-place grid penalty for causing a collision with Kevin Magnussen at the previous round.

Race

Race report 
Lewis Hamilton got ahead of Carlos Sainz Jr. at the start and held it into turn six, when Sainz attempted to overtake Hamilton on the inside. Hamilton was forced wide and elected to cut the corner, going over the sausage kerb, allowing him to keep the position, going momentarily airborne. On lap five, Hamilton was instructed to let Sainz pass, and although they would continue to battle for a few laps, Sainz would pull away.

Hamilton's teammate, George Russell, was awarded a five-second time penalty for an unsafe release during his pit stop, having forced Lando Norris to brake to avoid a collision. This left Russell in sixth position after his second pit stop later in the race. On lap 27, Fernando Alonso retired from the race with a water leak. It was his fifth retirement due to a technical failure of the season, and his sixth overall. On lap 39, Mick Schumacher and Nicholas Latifi collided at turn 5, when Schumacher attempted to pass on the inside, spinning both and resulting in Latifi making contact with the barrier. Latifi would continue before retiring from the race with an electronics issue, while Schumacher was awarded a five-second time penalty.

The strategy battle saw a split between most teams; with Max Verstappen, Charles Leclerc, Sebastian Vettel, Daniel Ricciardo, Valtteri Bottas, Kevin Magnussen and Hamilton all employing a one-stop strategy while their teammates used a two-stop. Sergio Pérez pitted from second at the end of lap 33, rejoining in sixth. Despite the additional pace from fresher tyres, Pérez lost time behind lapped cars and during a battle with Hamilton, delaying his pursuit of Leclerc. On lap 55, Hamilton became stuck in seventh gear as his hydraulics system failed. This forced him into retirement, ending any chance Mercedes had of passing Ferrari for second in the Constructor's Championship. It also meant that, for the first time in Hamilton's 16-year career, he would go an entire season without recording a Grand Prix victory, a record streak.

Having led the race from the start, Verstappen won the Grand Prix by a comfortable margin, his third consecutive win in Abu Dhabi and his fifteenth of the season, extending his record. Leclerc held off Pérez to finish second, which allowed him to take second in the Drivers Championship by three points. Lance Stroll finished eighth, which was not enough for Aston Martin to claim sixth in the championship, finishing equal on points with Alfa Romeo, losing out on countback due to Alfa's best result of fifth versus Aston Martin's best result of sixth.

Race classification 

Notes
  – Includes one point for fastest lap.
  – Mick Schumacher received a five-second time penalty for causing a collision with Nicholas Latifi. His final position was not affected by the penalty.
  – Lewis Hamilton and Nicholas Latifi were classified as they completed more than 90% of the race distance.

Final Championship standings

Drivers' Championship standings

Constructors' Championship standings

 Note: Only the top five positions are included for both sets of standings.
 Competitors in bold and marked with an asterisk are the 2022 world champions.

See also
 2022 Yas Island Formula 2 round

References

External links

Abu Dhabi
2022
Abu Dhabi
Abu Dhabi Grand Prix